Dennis Ramirez (born August 19, 2001) is an American professional soccer player who plays as a midfielder for Liga Nacional club Antigua.

Career

Youth 
Ramirez joined the New England Revolution academy in 2018 after a season with the Boston Bolts academy in the USSDA.

Professional
On March 11, 2020, Ramirez signed to the New England Revolution II squad ahead of their inaugural season in the USL League One. After missing the entire 2020 season due to injury, Ramirez made his professional debut on April 10, 2021, appearing as a 76th–minute substitute against Fort Lauderdale CF. Ramirez was not announced as a returning player for the club's 2022 season where they'd be competing in the newly formed MLS Next Pro.

Personal
Ramirez is eligible to represent the United States and Guatemala at international level.

References

External links 
 

2001 births
Living people
American soccer players
Association football midfielders
New England Revolution II players
People from Waltham, Massachusetts
Soccer players from Massachusetts
USL League One players